"The Storming of El Caney" is a descriptive musical work by Russell Alexander.  It is frequently performed at a galop tempo, and has been recorded by bands including Merle Evans' Ringling Bros.-Barnum and Bailey circus band and The Washington Winds.

Named after a famous Spanish–American War battle, this work was published in 1903.  It is believed that this work originally had a different title, as a manuscript of an entirely different work with this same title is in the archives of Alexander's primary publisher, the C. L. Barnhouse Company.

American songs
1903 songs